There were several battles of Grozny:
 Siege of Grozny (1917) by Chechen branch of Savage Division
 Siege of Grozny (1918) by Terek Cossacks
 Battle of Grozny (1919) between Denikin and allied Bolsheviks and Islamists
 Battle of Grozny (1920) between White and Red armies
 Battle of August (August 1994) – a failed attempt by Provisional Council of the Chechen Republic to take the city from Chechen separatists
 Battle of Grozny (24 September – 2 October 1994) – a failed attempt by Provisional Council to take the city
 Battle of Grozny (14 October – 16 October 1994) – a failed attempt by Provisional Council to take the city
 Battle of Grozny (November 1994) – a failed attempt by Provisional Council to take the city
 Battle of Grozny (1994–1995) – Russian army takes the city from Chechen separatists
 Battle of Grozny (March 1996) – a three-day siege laid on the Russians by Chechen attackers
 Battle of Grozny (August 1996) – a successful retaking of the city by Chechen separatists
 Battle of Grozny (1999–2000) – Russian army takes the city from Chechen separatists